Balovaptan (developmental code name RG7314), is a selective small molecule antagonist of the vasopressin V1A receptor which is under development by Roche for the treatment of autism. As of August 2019, it is in a phase III clinical trial for adults and a phase II clinical trial for children for this indication.  On 29 January 2018, Roche announced that the US Food and Drug Administration (FDA) had granted Breakthrough Therapy Designation for balovaptan in individuals with autism spectrum disorder (ASD). The FDA granted this based on the results of the adult phase II clinical trial called VANILLA (Vasopressin ANtagonist to Improve sociaL communication in Autism) study. The currently-recruiting (Until March 2020) phase III adult study is called V1aduct and the currently-closed (August 2019) phase II child study is called Av1ation.

See also 
 ABT-436
 Nelivaptan
 SRX-246
 TS-121

References

External links 
 

Breakthrough therapy
Chloroarenes
Experimental drugs
2-Pyridyl compounds
Triazoles
Vasopressin receptor antagonists